Germanicopolis may refer to several cities named after Germanicus:

 Germanicopolis in Bithynia, a former name of Tahtalı, Turkey
 Germanicopolis in Isauria, a former name of Ermenek, Turkey
 Germanicopolis in Paphlagonia, a former name of Çankırı, Turkey